Haliburton—Kawartha Lakes—Brock (formerly Haliburton—Victoria—Brock) is a provincial electoral district in Central Ontario, Canada. It elects one member to the Legislative Assembly of Ontario.

It was created in 1999 from parts of Victoria—Haliburton, Durham East, Durham—York and Hastings—Peterborough.

When the riding was created it was called Haliburton—Victoria—Brock, and included all of Victoria County, most of Haliburton County, the townships of Brock, Galway-Cavendish and Harvey, Burleigh and Anstruther, Chandos and Cavan, as well as the village of Millbrook.

In 2007 it was renamed Haliburton—Kawartha Lakes—Brock after Victoria County was renamed Kawartha Lakes. The riding also gained the municipality of Algonquin Highlands, plus the entire municipality of Cavan-Monaghan. It therefore is now identical to the federal riding by the same name.

2009 by-election
On February 4, 2009, a writ was issued for a by-election to be held on March 5, 2009. 
The by-election was called to fill the seat vacated by Progressive Conservative Member of Provincial Parliament Laurie Scott, who quit so that PC leader John Tory could seek a seat in the legislature.

Rick Johnson, who ran for the Ontario Liberal Party in 2007 after he resigned as president of the Ontario Public School Boards' Association to run against Ms. Scott in 2007 because he was opposed to Mr. Tory's controversial promise to extend public funding to religious schools, is the Liberal candidate for the by-election. The Liberal riding association voted unanimously to support Johnson.

Brad Harness, leader of the minor Reform Party of Ontario, announced that the party planned to run a candidate, and slammed Tory as an "urbanite". However, as the writ came, the party failed to run a candidate.

The Green Party of Ontario announced its candidate would be Mike Schreiner, an award-winning entrepreneur, sustainable community champion and local food advocate.

On February 9, the Lindsay Post published a poll of local residents which indicated that Tory’s campaign was off to a rocky start, with nearly 70 percent of respondents saying that they opposed Scott's decision to step aside so that Tory could be a candidate, and nearly half of respondents stating that they were less likely to vote PC because of his candidacy. That outsider status (being from Toronto) likely played a major role in Tory's defeat, combined with the fact that Tory was more liberal than most conservative voters in the riding resulting in many potential PC voters staying home.

Members of Provincial Parliament

Election results

	
	

|align="left" colspan=2|Liberal  gain from  Progressive Conservative
|align="right"|Swing
|align="right"|  +11.58
|

2007 electoral reform referendum

References

Sources
Elections Ontario Past Election Results
Map of riding for 2018 election

Ontario provincial electoral districts
Kawartha Lakes